Auckland Unlimited is the council-controlled organisation (CCO) of Auckland Council that serves as Auckland's economic and cultural agency. The organisation runs major assets such as the zoo, theatres, stadiums, galleries and other facilities. It was formed in December 2020 from the merger of Auckland Tourism, Events and Economic Development (ATEED) and Regional Facilities Auckland. It self-funds some of its operations but is subsidised by the council for the majority.

Background 
Auckland Unlimited was formed from the merger of Auckland Tourism, Events and Economic Development (ATEED) and Regional Facilities Auckland in December 2020, following a review of Auckland's council-controlled organisations. The review recommended that the two CCOs be amalgamated on the basis that they had similar goals and performed similar activities, some of which overlapped. The review concluded that having these functions all performed by a single entity would lead to cost savings and efficiencies, as well as a single coordinated programme for delivery of these functions. The council followed through with the recommendation - reducing the number of CCOs from five to four - and councilors voted to call the new organisation "Auckland Unlimited," with a Te Reo Maori name expected to be introduced in the long term. At the time of merger, the two organisations had a combined annual budget of $175 million, with the new organisation expected to yield $6.7 million in annual cost-savings over the first decade of its existence.

Purpose 
Auckland Unlimited is charged with supporting the Economic and Cultural development of Auckland. From one of its predecessors (Regional Facilities Auckland) it has acquired responsibly for many of the major regional facilities of Auckland such as Auckland Zoo, Auckland Art Gallery, the Aotea Centre, and various major sports facilities. From ATEED, it has acquired responsibly for major events as well as various other activities to support the Auckland economy.

The organisation's statement of intent lists its strategic responsibilities as being:

 "Enhancing Auckland as a culturally vibrant city for all"
 "Expanding economic opportunities for all Aucklanders"
 "Achieving social, economic, cultural and environmental return on Tataki Auckland Unlimited's investment"
 "Enhancing Auckland's local, national and global reputation and appeal"
 "Increasing capital invested into Auckland for economic and cultural outcomes."

Organisation

Owned Facilities  

 Aotea Centre 
 Auckland Art Gallery 
 Auckland Zoo 
 Bruce Mason Centre
 Mt Smart Stadium
 New Zealand Maritime Museum 
 North Harbour Stadium 
 The Civic Theatre
 Western Springs Stadium 
 Viaduct Events Centre 
 Spark Arena (long-term lease to a third party)

Controversies

Wayne Brown

2022 Mayoral Campaign 
In his 2022 Mayoral Campaign, candidate Wayne Brown was heavily critical of Auckland's council-controlled organisations - including Auckland Unlimited. He campaigned to "Take Back Control of Council Organisations", declaring that "Panuku & Auckland Unlimited are expensive organisations that need to prove their worth. They must be accountable and deliver real benefit for ratepayers or be shut down. [...] Auckland Unlimited is a sprawling empire that needs to be refocused back to top priorities."  He was also reported as promising to stop ratepayer funding for the organisation, calling it a "tourism promotions company" and - at other times - a "travel agency" while questioning why the council was "subsidising" it. Upon assuming office as mayor, however, he was quoted as saying that he was "pleasantly surprised" with the organisation after attending a governing body briefing presented by the CCOs. During the campaign an article on the news website - Stuff - was critical of Brown's position on Auckland Unlimited and his depiction of it as a "travel agency," pointing out that the organisation runs major Auckland assets such as "the zoo, theatres, stadiums, galleries and other facilities and self-funds 44% of its operation."

Art Gallery Controversy 
In December 2022, Auckland Mayor Wayne Brown once again clashed with Auckland Unlimited over its management of the Auckland Art Gallery. The organisation presented its quarterly report to the CCO Direction and Oversight committee of the council's governing body; the presentation reportedly made mention of the fact that the Art Gallery missed its target of 13,000 visitors between July and September, and only had 9516. This reportedly led to the mayor making various "disparaging" remarks about the Art Gallery, including "How do we get to have 122 people looking after a few paintings in a building that nobody goes to?" and "9500 wouldn't run a dairy in terms of turnover." Auckland Unlimited later clarified that the 9516 statistic referred to the visitors to paid exhibitions and that the Art Gallery received 54, 812 total visitors over that period.

References 

Politics of the Auckland Region
Auckland Council
Economic development organizations
Government agencies of New Zealand